Paicavi River, Río Paicaví, is a river of the Bío Bío Region of Chile.

Rivers of Chile
Rivers of Biobío Region